Bugchasing (alternatively bug chasing) is the rare practice of intentionally seeking human immunodeficiency virus (HIV) infection through sexual activity. 

Bugchasers—those who eroticize HIV—constitute a subculture of barebackers, men who have unprotected sex with other men. It is exceedingly uncommon for men to self-identify as bugchasers, but among those who do, their behavior does not consistently match this identification; instead, they often seek ambiguous sexual situations, rather than ones in which their partner is known to have HIV. There are some explanations for the behavior, ranging from sexual excitement at the idea of HIV-positive status, to finding a shared sense of community with other HIV-positive people, to suicidality.

By 2003, the concept had entered the public consciousness after Rolling Stone published "Bug Chasers: The men who long to be HIV+", an article describing the practice. It may have existed since the AIDS crisis began. It has since been mentioned in or the focus of pieces of media and popular culture. , bugchasing behavior still persists as a niche behavior, in spite of the widespread availability of effective PrEP and HAART treatments that protect against HIV transmission in otherwise unprotected sex.

Origins 

The precise origins of bugchasing—the pursuit of HIV infection—are largely unknown, with its inception located either at the beginning of the AIDS crisis or closer to the 1990s. But it existed by at least 1997, when Newsweek published an article about the subject, followed by Rolling Stone in 2003. The Rolling Stone article, "Bug Chasers: The men who long to be HIV+", was the first to bring widespread concern and attention to the practice. That article claimed that around 25 percent of all new HIV infections in the United States (10,000 of 45,000) were linked to bugchasing activity.
Freeman's analysis, however, did not only count bugchasers: it included all men who engaged in barebacking, regardless of motivation or attempts to seek out HIV infection, reporting them all together as bugchasers. Authorities that Freeman cited have since claimed he fabricated their statements, and his data have been widely criticized. Even so, Freeman's article was arguably responsible for bringing the term bugchasing to the mainstream,
viewing bugchasing as both self-destructive and pitiful.

Motivation and activity 
Bugchasers are men who have sex with men (MSM) who eroticize HIV infection, especially through the intentional pursuit (or intended pursuit) of infection with the virus. Since little is understood about the practice in general, the motivations for developing bugchasing identity and behavior remain largely undefined. However, there are four common motivating explanations.

First, it is suggested that some men become bugchasers as a result of fear of HIV infection, which had previously altered their sexual behavior, such as men abstaining from sex entirely, committing to one partner, or using preventative measures such as condoms. In this way, bugchasing may be viewed as empowering, both sexually and personally; the transformation of bugchasers from HIV-negative to HIV-positive status is understood by the group as masculinizing, which grants them additional status. Second, some men view HIV-positive status as erotic or sexually stimulating. It may be a subject of pleasure or the ultimate taboo to overcome.
Third, bugchasers may understand HIV-positive status (or its pursuit) as granting a shared identity and sense of community.
And fourth, bugchasing has been described as a political device and action against social norms (such as those tied to heteronormativity) through transgression of particular ideals, which in this case includes rigid conformity to safe sex practices. There is a fifth possible motivation—suicide—but this remains an unclear or imprecise explanation for bugchasing behavior.

Bugchasing is a rare sexual taboo. Many self-identified bugchasers do not deliberately seek out sex with HIV-positive people, and their identities frequently do not align with their actions.
There are many self-identified bugchasers on the internet, using sites such as Twitter and (formerly) Tumblr. 

The widespread availability of pre-exposure prophylaxis (PrEP), capable of preventing HIV infection in otherwise unprotected sexual encounters, has not resulted in the disappearance of bugchasing. Some men incorporate taking PrEP alongside bugchasing behavior, others experiment with bugchasing while on PrEP, and others view it as emasculating and refuse to use it.

Group dynamics 
While barebacking and bugchasing are both centered in risky sexual activity, they are not necessarily equivalent activities. Instead, bugchasing is a subculture of barebacking, with intent being a defining characteristic: most barebackers have no intent in transmitting or being infected with HIV, which is the apparent focus of bugchasing behavior.

But among bugchasers in particular, there remain several common metaphors that distinguish them from other communities among MSM: those of insemination, pregnancy, and paternity. Since HIV is able to spread and reproduce through the sexual activity belonging to bugchasing, its cultural dimensions—institutions, norms, practices, and forms of kinship that, taken together, form a community situated around HIV status—may be transmitted through viral infection, similar to cultural propagation through birth and paternity.
It is this sense of community—at once built but also destroyed by the consequences of HIV infection—that is described by ethnographer Jaime García-Iglesias as both "queer world-making and world-shattering". But perhaps even more to the point of the metaphor, the physical characteristics of HIV infection are similar to pregnancy, as typically some time passes before either diagnosis could be established.

Similarly, bugchasing spaces may reinforce certain notions of masculinity. The sex researcher Ellie Reynolds writes that HIV-positive men who purposely seek out others to infect with HIV—known as giftgivers—are constructed as hypermasculine through a penetrative sexual role, while bugchasers are understood to lack masculinity: penetrated (rather than penetrating), having their rectums described with words relating to women such as "pussy" and "mancunt", they occupy a feminine role in the social order.

Bugchasing remains controversial, with some academics and gay activists minimizing its prevalence or denying it exists altogether. Queer studies scholar Chris Ashford suggests that this controversy is due to the de-sexed mainstream LGBT activism since the AIDS epidemic began which seeks the fulfillment of a more mainstream political agenda. For example, in response to Freeman's 2003 Rolling Stone article which brought attention to bugchasing, the Human Rights Campaign (an LGBT advocacy group centered in liberal politics) was described by sexuality studies scholar Adam J. Greteman as upset because the practice did not align with its political ambitions, which Greteman characterized as homonormative.

Media and culture 
American filmmaker Louise Hogarth released a documentary, The Gift, in the same year the Rolling Stone piece was published. It focused on narratives of bugchasers, emphasizing the self-reported positive aspects of HIV infection. Three years later, Ricky Dyer, an HIV-positive man, released a documentary through BBC3 entitled "I love being HIV+", suggesting that most bugchasing activity is simply fantasy. In 2009, gay playwright Erik Patterson ran the tragicomedy He Asked For It, dealing with bugchasing and HIV-positive status in contemporary Hollywood. Bugchasing was also a part of the show Queer as Folk.

In 2012, Canadian Steven Boone was tried and convicted of three counts each of attempted murder and aggravated sexual assault after having unprotected sex with four men after previously contracting HIV. A self-described "poz vampire"—the word poz referring to acquiring HIV—he was immersed in bugchasing culture. His convictions on attempted murder have since been quashed after appealing to the Court of Appeal for Ontario, while the aggravated sexual assault convictions remain. The appeals court said it was not proven in the original case that he intended to kill his sexual partners; it offered the government the possibility of a new trial. Other cases of people being charged for the willful transmission of HIV have been reported.

References

Citations

Bibliography 

 
 
 
 
 
 
 
 
 
 

 
 
 
 
 
 
 
 
  
 
 
 
 
 
 
 
 
 
 
 
 
 
 
 
 
 
 
 
 
 
 
 
 
 
 
 
 
 
 
 
 
 
 
 
 

HIV/AIDS
LGBT slang
Self-harm
Sexual health
Suicide methods